Naxipenetretus is a genus of beetles in the family Carabidae, containing the following species:

 Naxipenetretus sciakyi Zamotajlov, 1999
 Naxipenetretus trisetosus (Zamotajlov & Sciaky, 1996)

References

Trechinae